Valeriana sambucifolia is a species of flowering plant belonging to the family Caprifoliaceae.

Synonyms:
 Valeriana murmanica Orlova
 Valeriana officinalis var. nitida
 Valeriana pleijelii Kreyer
 Valeriana procurrens subsp. salina Á.Löve & D.Löve

Subspecies:
 Valeriana sambucifolia subsp. salina (synonym Valeriana salina Pleijel)

References

sambucifolia